This is about the Cassville Municipal Airport in Missouri (94K). For the airport in Wisconsin with the same name (C74), see Cassville Municipal Airport

Cassville Municipal Airport is a public use airport located approximately two nautical miles northwest of Cassville, Missouri. The field elevation is 1483 feet above mean sea level, and the FAA location identifier is 94K. The airport has a single runway, designated 9/27, with an asphalt surface, 3,599 feet long by 60 feet wide. The airport is owned by the city of Cassville and has no control tower.

References

External links 
AOPA (Aircraft Owner's and Pilot's Association) page for 94K
FAA Airport Information for 94K
SkyVector (aeronautical chart view of 94K and vicinity)

Airports in Missouri
Barry County, Missouri